Hasan Mahmudi (or Mahdi) Kamboh was an ancestor of the Kamboh Nawabs of Meerut.

Biography

He was a Wazir (minister) of Sultan Mahmud of Ghazni (971 AD – 1030 AD) and came to India during one of Sultan's war expeditions against the India during tenth/eleventh centuries. Hasan Mahmudi Kamboh captured the city of Meerut from its Raja Mai. Many Kamboh soldiers of his regiment are stated to have fallen during the attack. To perpetuate their memory, Husan Mahmudi erected Jama Masjid in 1019 AD, adjacent to where his Kamboh soldiers fell fighting during attack on Meerut. It was later repaired by Mughal Emperor Humayun in sixteenth century. Hasan Mahmudi's descendants later built another important building called Sangi Mahal. Both these ancient buildings still exist in Meerut. In later times, the most notable members from Hasan Mahmudi's family were Nawab Mohammad Khan alias Nawab General Kheir Andesh Khan and Nawab General Kheir Andesh Khan Sani. Nawab Mohammad Khan who flourished in the reigns of Shah Jahan and Aurangzeb had built the famous Khairnagar gate, Meerut fort, and many other buildings in Meerut.

See also
 Muslim Kamboh
 Nawab Khair Andesh Khan Sani
 Nawab Khair Andesh Khan

References

11th-century deaths
Year of birth unknown
People from Meerut